Hugo Wilhelm Friedhofer (May 3, 1901May 17, 1981) was an American composer and cellist best known for his motion picture scores.

Biography
Hugo Wilhelm Friedhofer was born in San Francisco, California, United States. His father, Paul, was a cellist trained in Dresden, Germany; his mother, Eva König, was born in Germany.

Friedhofer began playing cello at the age of 13.  After taking lessons in harmony and counterpoint at University of California, Berkeley, he was employed as a cellist for the People's Symphony Orchestra.

In 1929, he relocated to Hollywood, where he performed as a musician for Fox Studios productions such as Sunny Side Up (1920) and Grand Canary (1934). Later, he was hired as an orchestrator for Warner Bros. and worked on more than 50 films for the studio. While at Warners he was largely assigned to work with Max Steiner and, because he could speak German, Erich Wolfgang Korngold. Steiner, in particular, relied on Friedhofer's skill in turning his sketches into a full orchestral score.

In 1937, Friedhofer composed his first full-length film score, The Adventures of Marco Polo.  Though he was still employed as an orchestrator through the 1930s and into the 1940s, he gradually received more assignments as a composer. In 1942, he composed the score for the film Chetniks! The Fighting Guerrillas.

In 1946, Friedhofer was hired to compose the score for the 1946 William Wyler directed film, The Best Years of Our Lives, which earned him an Oscar for Best Original Score at the 1947 Academy Awards, beating Bernard Herrmann, Miklós Rózsa, William Walton and Franz Waxman.  A new recording of the score, released in 1979 by Entr'acte Recording Society, was favorably received at the time.

Friedhofer was also nominated for other films, including The Bishop's Wife, Joan of Arc, Above and Beyond, Between Heaven and Hell, Boy on a Dolphin, An Affair to Remember, and The Young Lions.

Friedhofer, who was greatly admired by his colleagues, was also noted for his caustic, self-deprecating wit. When asked by fellow composer David Raksin as to the progress he was making on his score for Joan of Arc, he replied, "I've just started on the barbecue!". In reply to an interview by Page Cook, the film music critic at Films in Review magazine, who inquired about his place in the pantheon of film musicians, Friedhofer said, "I am just a fake giant among real pygmies."

A biographical collection of essays, letters and interviews has been edited by Linda Danly.

He died at St. Vincent Hospital from complications of a fall on May 17, 1981.

Film and television work
Friedhofer wrote music for 256 movies, shorts or television episodes without credit — as a music department composer of themes, additional music, stock music, incidental music or background music. He composed as a primary composer, both credited and uncredited, for 166 movies, shorts or television episodes.

Films

The Dancers (1930)
Heartbreak (1931)
Orient Express (1934)
The Adventures of Marco Polo (1938)
The Adventures of Robin Hood (1938)
Topper Takes a Trip (1938)
China Girl (1942)
Chetniks! The Fighting Guerrillas (1943)
They Came to Blow Up America (1943)
Paris After Dark (1943)
Lifeboat (1944)
The Lodger (1944)
Roger Touhy, Gangster (1944)
Home in Indiana (1944)
Wing and a Prayer (1944)
The Bandit of Sherwood Forest (1946)
So Dark the Night (1946)
The Best Years of Our Lives (1946)
Body and Soul (1947)
Wild Harvest (1947)
The Bishop's Wife (1947)
The Swordsman (1948)
Adventures of Casanova (1948)
Enchantment (1948) 
Joan of Arc (1948) 
Sealed Verdict (1948) 
Bride of Vengeance (1949)
Guilty of Treason (1950)
The Sound of Fury (1950) 
Two Flags West (1950)
Edge of Doom (1950)
Broken Arrow (1950)
Captain Carey, U.S.A. (1950)
No Man of Her Own (1950)
Three Came Home (1950)
Queen for a Day (1951) 
Ace in the Hole (1951)
The Marrying Kind (1952)
The Outcasts of Poker Flat (1952)
Lydia Bailey (1952)
Above and Beyond (1952)
Thunder in the East (1952)
Man in the Attic (1953) 
Hondo (1953) 
Vera Cruz (1954)
The Rains of Ranchipur (1955)  
Seven Cities of Gold (1955)
Soldier of Fortune (1955) 
Violent Saturday (1955) 
White Feather (1955) 
Between Heaven and Hell (1956)
The Revolt of Mamie Stover (1956) 
The Harder They Fall (1956)
The Sun Also Rises (1957) 
An Affair to Remember (1957) 
Boy on a Dolphin (1957)
The Young Lions (1958)
In Love and War (1958) 
The Barbarian and the Geisha (1958)
Never So Few (1959)
The Blue Angel (1959)
This Earth Is Mine (1959) 
Woman Obsessed (1959)
Homicidal (1961) 
One-Eyed Jacks (1961)
Beauty and the Beast (1962) 
Geronimo (1962)
The Secret Invasion (1964) 
The Over-the-Hill Gang (1969) 
Von Richthofen and Brown (1971) 
Die Sister, Die! (1972)
Private Parts (1972)

Television
Outlaws (1960–61) (episodes for TV series)
Empire (1962) (TV series)
Voyage to the Bottom of the Sea (1964) (episodes for TV series)
The Guns of Will Sonnett (1967) (episodes for TV series)
I Spy (1966–68) (episodes for TV series)
Lancer (1968–69) (episodes for TV series)
My Friend Tony (1969) (episode for TV series)
The F.B.I. (1970) (episode for TV series)
Barnaby Jones (1973–78) (episodes for TV series)
Psychette: William Castle and 'Homicidal' (2002) (video short released after Friedhofer's death)

See also
Max Steiner filmography for notes on Steiner scores Friedhofer orchestrated

References

External links
 
 The Fishko Files: Hugo Friedhofer from WNYC's Sara Fishko's radio segments about the arts.
 Hugo Friedhofer unofficial website
 The Best Years of Our Lives and Hugo Friedhofer
 Hugo Friedhofer papers, MSS 2021 at the L. Tom Perry Special Collections, Harold B. Lee Library, Brigham Young University

1901 births
1981 deaths
20th-century American composers
20th-century American male musicians
20th-century classical composers
American classical composers
American film score composers
American male classical composers
American people of German descent
Best Original Music Score Academy Award winners
American male film score composers
University of California, Berkeley alumni